Hang Tuff is an album by Ethnic Heritage Ensemble, a jazz band formed by percussionist Kahil El'Zabar, who is joined by saxophonist Edward Wilkerson and trombonist Joseph Bowie. It was recorded in 1990 and released on the German Open Minds label.

Reception

The Penguin Guide to Jazz states "Hang Tuff has a quiet, chamberish quality which suggests that the horn players felt slightly constrained by El'Zabar's concentration on texture."

Track listing
All compositions by Kahil El'Zabar except as indicated
 "Hang Tuff" – 9:58
 "Bobo" (Joseph Bowie) – 12:07 
 "Afro Slick" – 7:28 
 "Peace on Earth" – 8:05
 "Trane in Mind" – 9:21
 "Indestructible Consciousness" – 13:40

Personnel
Kahil El'Zabar –  trap and earth drums, sanza, ankle bells, vocals
Edward Wilkerson – alto sax, tenor sax, clarinet, piano, percussion
Joseph Bowie – trombone, congas

References

1991 albums
Kahil El'Zabar albums